Alexander Nikolayevich Shimin (born 2 January 1970) is a Kazakhstani former ice hockey goaltender and coach. He played for several teams during his career, mainly with Torpedo Ust-Kamenogorsk in his hometown. Shimin also played for the Kazakhstani national team, including at the 1998 Winter Olympics. After he retired from playing he turned to coaching, initially with Torpedo.

References

External links 

1970 births
Asian Games medalists in ice hockey
Asian Games silver medalists for Kazakhstan
Barys Nur-Sultan players
Ice hockey players at the 1998 Winter Olympics
Ice hockey players at the 2003 Asian Winter Games
Kazakhstan men's national ice hockey team coaches
Kazakhstani ice hockey goaltenders
Kazzinc-Torpedo players
Living people
Medalists at the 2003 Asian Winter Games
Olympic ice hockey players of Kazakhstan
Soviet ice hockey goaltenders
Sportspeople from Oskemen
Yenbek Almaty players
Yuzhny Ural Orsk players